Barbara M. Knickerbocker Beskind (born 1924) is an American inventor and designer.

Early education and career
Barbara Beskind is a designer and internationally recognized pioneer in the field of occupational therapy. Beskind graduated in 1945 from the College of Home Economics at Syracuse University with a BS in Applied Arts and Design. At the end of World War II, she trained as an occupational therapist through the U.S. Army's War Emergency Course and served for 20 years, retiring as a major in 1966. She went on to found the Princeton Center for Learning Disorders, the first independent private practice in occupational therapy in the U.S. She authored a clinical text published in 1980 on the treatment of children with learning disorders and holds a patent for inflatable equipment that helps learning-disordered children improve their balance. The American Occupational Therapy Association honored Beskind as a Charter Fellow in recognition of her innovative therapeutic techniques. In 1989 she retired after a 44-year career in occupational therapy.

Following her retirement, she studied creative and non-fiction writing at Bennington College (three summer courses) and six semesters at Lebanon College. As a result, she has published three more books authored also under her maiden name Barbara Knickerbocker: an historical family autobiography, Powderkeg; a book of her art and poetry, Touches of Life in Time and Space; and an historical fiction, Flax to Freedom.

Beskind studied abstract art at Sharon Arts Center in Sharon, New Hampshire, with a focus on its early roots in the Russian avant-garde. After three trips to Russia to study these artists, she taught a non-credit course at Colby-Sawyer College in New London, New Hampshire.

IDEO
In January 2013, Beskind saw IDEO founder David Kelley speak on 60 Minutes about the importance of cultivating a diversity of experience among team members developing new products and services. Beskind wrote to the company, offering to help IDEO design for aging and low-vision populations. Then at age 89, she began working for IDEO in their Bay Area offices and has been directly involved with client projects related to contact lenses, health care delivery, and retirement home services.

As a conceptual designer, she has developed specific ideas for a pair of glasses for those with macular degeneration such as she has. She is developing an alternative walker called the "Trekker" with vertical grips to promote good posture and to maintain alternative arm-leg movements. She has adapted ski poles to preserve good balance and gait patterns for those with vision and mobility problems.

References

1924 births
Living people
20th-century American women writers
21st-century American biographers
21st-century American women writers
21st-century American poets
20th-century American inventors
21st-century American inventors
American women biographers
American autobiographers
American women poets
American historical fiction writers
Place of birth missing (living people)
Occupational therapists
Syracuse University alumni
United States Army officers
Women autobiographers
Women inventors